Albert Theodore Mollegen, Sr. (February 17, 1906 – January 22, 1984) was a widely-known apologist for classical Christianity and a proponent of evangelical liberalism.

Birth and early years 
Mollegen was born in McComb, Mississippi to Charles Henry Mollegen (1880–1912) and Bessie Lee McDonald (1882–1969). His father died when he was very young. 

He studied at Mississippi Agricultural & Mechanical College (now Mississippi State University) before graduating from Virginia Theological Seminary in Alexandria. Graduate coursework was completed in New York City. He earned a master's degree at Union Theological Seminary and a doctorate at the General Theological Seminary. 

At Union, Mollegen was one of the first American students of the religious socialist Paul Tillich. He later became one of Tillich's most articulate adherents.

Career 
Mollegen taught New Testament language and literature and Christian ethics at the Virginia Theological Seminary for most of his career.   He also lectured at many campuses including the University of Chicago, University of Florida, Trinity College in Hartford, Connecticut, Southern Methodist University, and Cambridge University.

In 1947, he founded Christianity and Modern Man, a liberal evangelical organization.

He retired from the faculty of the Virginia Theological Seminary in 1974.

Personal life 
His wife, the former Harriette Ione Rush of Meridian, Mississippi, died in 1978. He has a son, A.T. Mollegen Jr. (known as Ted) of Mystic, Conn.; a daughter, Anne Mollegen Smith of New York City, and three grandchildren.

Works

Books 
 Mollegen, Albert T., The faith of Christians (1954)
 Mollegen, Albert T., The Christianity of St. Paul (1956)
 Mollegen, Albert T., Christianity and modern man ; the crisis of secularism (The Bobbs-Merrill Company, Indianopolis, Indiana, 1961).

Articles 

 
 Mollegen, Albert T., and Charles P. Price, Existentialism: question or answer? (1961)

See also
Christian apologetics

References 

1906 births
1984 deaths
American theologians
Christian apologists
Christian writers
Evangelicalism in the United States
Writers from Mississippi
The Stony Brook School alumni
General Theological Seminary alumni
Mississippi State University alumni
Union Theological Seminary (New York City) alumni
Virginia Theological Seminary alumni
Virginia Theological Seminary faculty